Artanes was a coastal town of ancient Bithynia located on the Pontus Euxinus at the mouth of the Artanes River (the modern Türknil Nehri). There was a port and a temple of Venus.

Its site is located near Şile in Asiatic Turkey.

References

Populated places in Bithynia
Former populated places in Turkey
History of Istanbul Province